Burke & Hare, sometimes called Burke and Hare or The Horrors of Burke and Hare, is a 1972 horror film, directed by Vernon Sewell, and starring Derren Nesbitt, Harry Andrews, and Glynn Edwards. It is based on the true life story of the Burke and Hare murders, and was the last film to be directed by Vernon Sewell. Typically for its time the film is considerably more sexual that most of its counterparts, and much of the plot focusses on brothel activities.

It was shot at Twickenham Studios in London. The film's sets were designed by the art director Scott MacGregor.

Plot
In Edinburgh, in 1828, there are two sides to society: men living in dirty hovels and grave robbing to make a living; and rich men going to the brothels. Meanwhile, the doctors dine  together and drink wine.

Surgeon Dr Robert Knox (Harry Andrews) needs bodies for dissection to satisfy the training needs of his medical students. As only hanging victims may be used, bodies are in short supply. In order to serve the greater good of medical science he employs grave-robbers Burke and Hare (Derren Nesbitt and Glynn Edwards) to supply fresh corpses for his anatomical lectures at the medical academy. The authorities turn a blind eye knowing that stemming the crime would lessen the medical training.

The pair of "resurrectionists" are paid £7 10s for their first body - a truly large sum at that time.

The students in the anatomy theatre appreciate Knox's lectures and demonstrations.

However, when graveyard supplies run low, the industrious pair turn to murder to keep the business going and simply claim to have robbed the bodies. They start with the poor people who co-habit their lodging house on West Port, and these people may have might have legitimately died. Due to greed they gradually get bolder picking younger victims.

Their wives are aware of the murders and indeed encourage and watch the crimes.

But when Mrs Hare brings Daft Jamie home to murder things start to go wrong.. as Jamie is well known. When is body reaches Knox it is seen Jamie has been in a fight. Two of the city guard arrive looking for Jamie. Knox destroys Jamie's head and tells the guards it is a boy killed in a factory accident.

The local brothel burns down and the girls need to find new accommodation. Prostitute Marie and her friend meet Burke in a bar who offers them accommodation. Mary fails to turn up for her rendezvous with her medical student lover... who is shocked when he sees her next on the anatomy table. He asks to speak to Knox. Knox tells the student that he did an autopsy and she died of alcoholism.

The student sneaks into Knox's private dissection room at night. He then goes to Madame Thompson and tells her Marie is dead. She directs him to a tavern in the West Port.

Meanwhile, in the tavern Burke meets an old match-seller, Mary Docherty. He takes her back to his house at Tanners Close to join their Halloween party. A drunken fight breaks out as the student arrives having tracked them down. He calls the City Guard who break up the fight and find the dead body of Mary Docherty.

A voice over explains what then happened to each character.

Cast
 Derren Nesbitt as Burke
 Harry Andrews as Dr Knox
 Glynn Edwards as Hare
 Yootha Joyce as Mrs Hare
 Françoise Pascal as Marie
 Yutte Stensgaard as Janet
 Robin Hawdon as Lord Angus McPhee
 Alan Tucker as Arbuthnot
 Dee Shenderey as  Mrs Burke
 Joan Carol as Madame Thompson, owner of the brothel
 Paul Greaves as Ferguson
 David Pugh as Daft Jamie
 James Hayter as Dr Selby
 Thomas Heathcote as Knox's assistant, Paterson
 Duncan Lamont as Dr Saint

Theme Song
The eponymous theme song, which opens and closes the film, was written by Roger Webb with lyrics by Norman Newell, and performed by English comedy/musical trio The Scaffold, with uncredited vocal assistance by Vivian Stanshall.

Critical reception
Allmovie wrote, "the producers opted for sexploitation over gruesome horror, but the end result is decidedly dull"; and the Radio Times agreed, writing, "the accent is on sleazy sexploitation and bawdy comedy rather than anything truly macabre or frightening. Arguably the worst film adaptation of the exploits of the notorious West Port serial killers"; whereas Fantastic Movie Musings and Ramblings wrote, "I like it well enough, largely due to some interesting dialogue and energetic direction from Vernon Sewell, whose credits include The Blood Beast Terror and Curse of the Crimson Altar...The performances are also fun; in particular, Harry Andrews gives a memorable performance as Dr Knox, who wears an eyepatch and regales his friends with off-colour jokes. I was pleasantly surprised by this one, as I wasn't expecting much."

See also
 The Greed of William Hart (1948)
 The Flesh and the Fiends (1960)
 The Doctor and the Devil (1965)
 The Doctor and the Devils (1985)
 Burke & Hare (Comedy, 2010)

References

External links

https://web.archive.org/web/20110704102215/http://www.britmovie.co.uk/films/Burke-and-Hare_1971

1972 films
1972 horror films
1970s serial killer films
1970s historical horror films
British historical horror films
British serial killer films
1970s English-language films
Films directed by Vernon Sewell
Biographical films about serial killers
Films set in the 1820s
Films set in Edinburgh
Cultural depictions of William Burke and Hare
Films shot at Twickenham Film Studios
Grave-robbing in film
1970s British films